Gavin Casalegno (born September 2, 1999) is an American actor and model, best known for playing Jeremiah Fisher on the series The Summer I Turned Pretty (2022), adapted from the best-selling trilogy with the same title by Jenny Han. His other notable projects include Darren Aronofsky's Noah (2014) and The Vampire Diaries (2015).

He is currently filming the second season of The Summer I Turned Pretty in North Carolina.

Early life 
Gavin Casalegno was born in Dallas, Texas, to American parents. He is the eldest of three children; he has one younger brother and a younger sister, Ashlyn Casalegno, who also is an actress and model.

Casalegno attended Lovejoy High School, Lucas, Texas.

Career 
Casalegno's mother's friend suggested he try modeling, which prompted his mother to look into agencies. At the age of four, he booked his first modeling job for JC Penny. He made numerous appearances in commercials such as Sony and Papa John's in the mid-2000s. Because he was a minor, his mother, Allyson Casalegno, was his manager while he traveled for work and auditions .  He relocated to Los Angeles for bigger opportunities and, by the age of eleven, he booked his first film project. He then took on various roles, namely, young Shem in Noah in 2014, young Damon Salvatore in the CW television series, The Vampire Diaries in 2015, and Trevor Strand in the first season of Walker in 2021.

In July 2021, Deadline reported that Casalegno would play Jeremiah Fisher as one of the main characters in the Amazon Prime television series based on Jenny Han's coming-of-age novel, The Summer I Turned Pretty, set to premiere on June 17, 2022. Amazon renewed season 2 of the series before its first season premiered without a release date. Casalegno is to reprise younger Fisher brother, Jeremiah – one of Belly's main love interests along with Conrad.

Personal life 
Gavin is passionate about his Christian faith, and is a mental health advocate.  He is an avid soccer and volleyball player.

He dated American dancer, model and actress,  Larsen Thompson, from 2015 to 2022.

Filmography

Film

Television

References

External links 

 Official Agency Webpage
 

1999 births
Actors from Dallas
American actors
Living people